Walhampton is a hamlet in the New Forest National Park of Hampshire, England. It is in the civil parish of Boldre. It is approximately half a mile east of Lymington, on the east bank of the Lymington River. The Solent Way, a long-distance footpath, passes close to the hamlet.

The Grade II* Burrard Monument, also known as the Walhampton Monument, is located in the hamlet. Erected in 1840 to the memory of Sir Harry Burrard-Neale, 2nd Baronet, a former Royal Navy Admiral and M.P. for Lymington between 1790 and 1832. The base of the  tapered obelisk is designed to look like an Egyptian doorway.

Walhampton has an independent prep school, the Walhampton School, which was founded after World War II. The school is housed in Walhampton House, a Grade-II*-listed building. A pub, the Walhampton Arms, is housed in the former dairy on the estate, listed at Grade II.

References

External links

The Walhampton School website

Hamlets in Hampshire
New Forest